Artesian is an unincorporated community in Yakima County, Washington, United States, located approximately one mile east of Moxee.

The community was named by James H. Gano, because several artesian wells were found in the area. Gano established the community's post office in his home in 1900.

References

Unincorporated communities in Yakima County, Washington
Unincorporated communities in Washington (state)